NRJ Lebanon is a radio station founded in 2006 by Jyad (Jihad El Murr) which is also part of the RML Group. NRJ Lebanon has one main frequency in Lebanon which is FM 99.1.

NRJ Lebanon targets young audience, trendy and up to date in music, NRJ programs are mainly in English with major British presenters, except for few live shows from NRJ France and some interviews made by NRJ France for international artists.

Current Hosts 
 Sarah Gharzeddine 
 Steve Peters

From 2011 to 2013, Jack Sleiman was the host and producer of “The Jack Sleiman Show” at NRJ Lebanon.

Shows
 Energy Morning Live with Sara from Monday to Friday starting from 7:00 AM till 10:00AM
 Energy Top 20 with Steve Peters every Friday starting from 7:00PM till 8:00PM
 EuroHot 30 hosted by Steve Peters every Sunday starting from 7:00PM till 8:00PM
 NRJ Extravadance every Friday & Saturday starting from 8:00PM till 3:00AM

NRJ Music Tour
NRJ Music Tour is a once a year event bringing a selection of artists each year to perform in Lebanon.

DJs perform on NRJ Extravadance

References 

Radio stations in Lebanon